Mallavi Central College is a provincial school in Mallavi, Sri Lanka.

See also
 List of schools in Northern Province, Sri Lanka

References

External links
 Mallavi Central College

Provincial schools in Sri Lanka
Schools in Mullaitivu District